Karl Hajos (born Hajós Károly, January 28, 1889 – February 1, 1950) was a Hungarian composer who worked on many film scores. Born in the Austro-Hungarian Empire, Hajos emigrated to the United States in 1924 and worked in Hollywood. Beginning in the late silent era, he worked on over 100 films with a variety of directors and studios. He was one of nine composers employed on the 1931 Western Fighting Caravans. In 1934, he worked on Cecil B. Demille's thriller Four Frightened People. He was nominated for two Academy Awards, in 1944 and 1945 in the Music Score of a Dramatic or Comedy Picture category for Summer Storm and The Man Who Walked Alone, respectively.

Selected filmography
 Loves of an Actress (1928)
 The Woman from Moscow (1928)
 Adoration (1928)
 Beggars of Life (1928)
 The Wolf of Wall Street (1929)
 The Sea God (1930)
 The Right to Love (1930)
 The Night of Decision (1931)
 Fighting Caravans (1931)
 Four Frightened People (1934)
 Werewolf of London (1935)
 Summer Storm (1944)
 Dangerous Intruder (1945)
 The Man Who Walked Alone (1945)
 Fog Island (1945)
 Secrets of Linda Hamilton (1945)
 The Mask of Diijon (1946)
 Wild Country (1947)
 Appointment with Murder (1948)
 The Lovable Cheat (1949)
 Search for Danger (1949)
 It's a Small World (1950)

References

Bibliography
 Wierzbicki, Eugene. Music, Sound and Filmmakers: Sonic Style in Cinema. Routledge, 2012.

External links

1889 births
1950 deaths
Hungarian film score composers
Male film score composers
Musicians from Budapest
20th-century Hungarian male musicians
Hungarian emigrants to the United States